Billy Liar is a sitcom of 26 30-minute episodes over two series made by London Weekend Television in 1973–1974 which starred Jeff Rawle as Billy Fisher. In addition there was a short five-minute long special as part of the All Star Comedy Carnival broadcast on 25 December 1973.

The semi-comical premise is based around William Fisher, a Northern working-class 19-year-old living with his parents and grandmother in the fictional town of Stradhoughton in Yorkshire. Bored by his job as a lowly clerk for Shadrack, an undertaker, and just as bored at home Billy spends his time indulging in fantasies and dreams of life in the big city as a comedy writer.

The series was based on the 1959 semi-autobiographical novel Billy Liar by Keith Waterhouse, which was later adapted into a play, a film, a musical and finally into the TV series. The scripts were by the play's writers, Keith Waterhouse and Willis Hall, with the story being updated to the 1970s. The theme was sung by Peter Skellern. George A. Cooper reprised his West End role as Billy's father. Other regular cast members included Pamela Vezey as Alice, Colin Jeavons as Shadrack, May Warden as Billy's grandmother, and Sally Watts as Barbara. Several new girlfriends were also introduced. Guest appearances were made by Thora Hird, Windsor Davies, Mollie Sugden, Magnus Magnusson, Kathy Staff and Roy Kinnear, among others.

The series has never been rerun on television, although the first series was released on Region 2 DVD in August 2006. The second series was released in March 2007. The complete series was released in May 2018. The series Billy Liar was shown on the Seven Network in Australia during the non-ratings season of 1975–1976, on CBC Television in Canada in 1975–1976, and on RTÉ 2 in Ireland in 1982.

An American adaptation entitled Billy and starring Steve Guttenberg, Peggy Pope, and James Gallery aired briefly on CBS in 1979.

Cast
Billy Fisher - Jeff Rawle
Geoffrey Fisher- George A. Cooper
Alice Fisher - Pamela Vezey
Mr Shadrack - Colin Jeavons
Billy's grandmother - May Warden
Barbara - Sally Watts

Episode guide

Series One (1973)

Christmas Special (1973)
Billy Liar featured as a short five-minute-long special as part of the All Star Comedy Carnival on 25 December 1973, an annual Christmas-special containing new mini-episodes of popular British sitcoms.

Series Two (1974)

References

External links
Billy Liar (1973 TV series) - Internet Movie Database

1973 British television series debuts
1974 British television series endings
ITV sitcoms
1970s British sitcoms
English-language television shows